Futebol Clube do Marco was a Portuguese football team based in Marco de Canaveses, Porto District. Founded in 1927, it held home games at Estádio Municipal de Marco de Canaveses, which has a 10,000-seat capacity.

History
Futebol Clube do Marco was founded on 25 May 1927. In 2000, it reached the second division for only the second time, being relegated at the end of the season, but immediately gaining promotion back.

During four consecutive seasons, Marco competed in the second level. In 2004–05, it achieved its best ever classification in the category, finishing in fourth position, nine points behind last promotee C.F. Estrela da Amadora. In the following campaign, the club ended its Portuguese Cup run with a valiant display against eventual winners FC Porto, losing 0–1 away.

On 27 September 2007, with Marco already in division three, the Portuguese Football Federation punished the club with relegation, suspension from all activity during two years and a €2,500 fine, following failure to appear in four league games. A new side was created in 2009–10 as Associação Desportiva de Marco de Canaveses (AD Marco 09 for short), competing in the Porto Second Regional Division, and achieving promotion in the first season.

Appearances
Tier 2: 6
Tier 3: 19
Tier 4: 5
Portuguese Cup: 27

League and Cup history

Last updated: 25 June 2015
Ti. = Tier; 1 = Portuguese League; 2 = Liga de Honra; 3 = Segunda Divisão / Campeonato Nacional de Seniores
4 = Terceira Divisão; 5 = AF Porto First Division
Pos. = Position; Pl = Match played; W = Win; D = Draw; L = Lost; GS = Goal scored; GA = Goal against; P = Points

References

External links
Official website 
Zerozeroteam profile

 
Football clubs in Portugal
Association football clubs established in 1927
1927 establishments in Portugal
Liga Portugal 2 clubs